Raja Dr. Rudra Pratap Singh (Raja Jamo Estate) is an Indian politician. He belonged to Jamo kingdom of ancient UP. He was MLA from Gauriganj in 1962.He was elected to the Lok Sabha, the lower house of the Parliament of India from the Barabanki, Uttar Pradesh constituency of Uttar Pradesh as a member of the Indian National Congress.

References

External links
 Official Biographical Sketch in Lok Sabha Website

Rajya Sabha members from Uttar Pradesh
Indian National Congress politicians
Lok Sabha members from Uttar Pradesh
India MPs 1971–1977
1936 births
Living people
Indian National Congress politicians from Uttar Pradesh